Trenton is a town in Hancock County, Maine, United States, near Acadia National Park. The population was 1,584 at the 2020 census. Hancock County-Bar Harbor Airport is located in Trenton.

In January 1969, town voters defeated 144–77 an attempt to build a nuclear power plant and aluminum refinery in Trenton.

Geography

Demographics

2010 census
As of the census of 2010, there were 1,481 people, 663 households, and 409 families living in the town. The racial makeup of the town was 95.3% White, 0.4% African American, 1.6% Native American, 0.4% Asian, 0.2% from other races, and 2.1% from two or more races. Hispanic or Latino of any race were 1.5% of the population.

There were 663 households, of which 23.7% had children under the age of 18 living with them, 46.8% were married couples living together, 8.3% had a female householder with no husband present, 6.6% had a male householder with no wife present, and 38.3% were non-families. 27.9% of all households were made up of individuals, and 8.3% had someone living alone who was 65 years of age or older. The average household size was 2.23 and the average family size was 2.72.

The median age in the town was 45.8 years. 17.4% of residents were under the age of 18; 7.4% were between the ages of 18 and 24; 24% were from 25 to 44; 36% were from 45 to 64; and 15.1% were 65 years of age or older. The gender makeup of the town was 50.6% male and 49.4% female.

2000 census
As of the census of 2000, there were 1,370 people, 574 households, and 388 families living in the town. The racial makeup of the town was 95.69% White, 0.58% African American, 1.46% Native American, 0.22% Asian, 0.07% Pacific Islander, 0.07% from other races, and 1.90% from two or more races. Hispanic or Latino of any race were 0.44% of the population.

There were 574 households, out of which 31.9% had children under the age of 18 living with them, 53.8% were married couples living together, 8.9% had a female householder with no husband present, and 32.4% were non-families. 27.0% of all households were made up of individuals, and 8.4% had someone living alone who was 65 years of age or older.  The average household size was 2.39 and the average family size was 2.89.

In the town, the population was spread out, with 24.5% under the age of 18, 6.0% from 18 to 24, 27.0% from 25 to 44, 27.7% from 45 to 64, and 14.7% who were 65 years of age or older.  The median age was 41 years. For every 100 females, there were 96.0 males.  For every 100 females age 18 and over, there were 90.1 males.

The median income for a household in the town was $34,808, and the median income for a family was $45,859. Males had a median income of $30,847 versus $25,197 for females. The per capita income for the town was $21,140.  About 6.2% of families and 10.0% of the population were below the poverty line, including 11.5% of those under age 18 and 8.5% of those age 65 or over.

Economy

Bar Harbor Airlines, a regional airline, was headquartered in Trenton. In 1989 the airline headquarters moved to Houston, Texas.

References

External links

 Town of Trenton

Towns in Hancock County, Maine
Towns in Maine
Populated coastal places in Maine